Antti Muurinen (born March 4, 1954) is a Finnish football coach.

Muurinen is probably best known as the head coach of the Finnish national team. He led Finland in qualifying campaigns for the 2002 World Cup, Euro 2004 and the 2006 World Cup, failing to reach the finals each time.

In June 2005 Finnish football fans held a protest against Muurinen, and after a 4–0 defeat against Netherlands, the Finnish FA sacked him.

In 2006, Muurinen was hired as the manager of FC Lahti in Finland's Veikkausliiga. Before the end of the 2007 season he returned to HJK Helsinki, where he managed them from the 1997 to 1999 season.

Muurinen is also known for leading HJK Helsinki into the UEFA Champions League group stage in the 1998–99 season, the only time a Finnish club has managed this feat. He has also won the Finnish championship with HJK Helsinki in 1997, 2009, 2010, 2011 and 2012 as well as with FC Kuusysi in 1989 and 1991, the Finnish Cup with HJK Helsinki in 1998 and 2008, and the Finnish League Cup with FC Lahti in 2007.

Honours
 Finnish Championship (7) : 1989, 1991, 1997, 2009, 2010, 2011, 2012
 Finnish Cup (3) : 1998, 2008, 2011
 Finnish League Cup (3) : 1997, 1998, 2007
 Coach of the year (5) : 1989, 1997, 1998, 2009, 2011
 First ever Finnish manager to participate in the UEFA Champions League group-stage. (1998–1999)

Double
2011 Finnish Championship and Finnish Cup

References

External links
Antti Muurinen at Footballdatabase

1954 births
Living people
People from Valkeakoski
Finnish football managers
Finland national football team managers
Helsingin Jalkapalloklubi managers
FC Lahti managers
FF Jaro managers
Sportspeople from Pirkanmaa